Hielscher is a German surname. Notable people with the surname include:

 Friedrich Hielscher (1902–1990), German poet and philosopher
 Hans Uwe Hielscher (born 1945), German organist and composer
 Leo Hielscher (born 1926), Australian administrator
 Margarete Hielscher (1899–1985), German doctor
 Margot Hielscher (1919–2017), German singer and film actress
 Ulf Hielscher (born 1967), German bobsledder

See also
 Josef Emanuel Hilscher (1806–1837), Austrian soldier, poet and translator
 Kurt Hilscher (1904–1980), German illustrator

German-language surnames